Dagmara is a given name. Notable people with the given name include:

Dagmara Domińczyk (born 1976), Polish-American actress and author
Dagmara Grad (born 1990), Polish footballer 
Dagmara Handzlik (born 1986), Polish-born Cypriot long distance runner
Dagmara Krzyżyńska (born 1981), Polish alpine skier
Dagmara Nocuń (born 1996), Polish handballer
Dagmara Wozniak (born 1988), American saber fencer

See also
Dagmar (given name)

Polish feminine given names